William Connor Fries (born April 4, 1998) is an American football offensive guard for the Indianapolis Colts of the National Football League (NFL). He played college football at Penn State and was drafted by the Colts in the seventh round, 248th overall, in the 2021 NFL Draft.

Raised in Cranford, New Jersey, Fries played prep football at Cranford High School.
Son to Harold & Maureen Fries. Will Fries is currently dating Loyola Womens Basketball star Isabella Therien.

Professional career

Fries was selected by the Indianapolis Colts in the seventh round, 248th overall, of the 2021 NFL Draft. On May 6, 2021, Fries officially signed with the Colts.

References

External links

Indianapolis Colts bio
Penn State Nittany Lions bio

Living people
Indianapolis Colts players
Cranford High School alumni
Penn State Nittany Lions football players
People from Cranford, New Jersey
Players of American football from New Jersey
Sportspeople from Union County, New Jersey
American football offensive guards
1998 births